Paweł Halaba (born 14 December 1995) is a Polish volleyball player. At the professional club level, he plays for Ślepsk Malow Suwałki.

Personal life
In 2012, he graduated from the Marshal Stanisław Małachowski High School in Płock. He began studying at AGH University of Science and Technology in Kraków but suspended the studies after one year to continue his volleyball career.

Career

Clubs
He debuted in first league in 2014 as a player of AZS AGH Kraków. Then he moved to AZS Politechnika Warszawska on loan from Asseco Resovia Rzeszów and debuted in PlusLiga. During the first round of season he got an ankle injury, but he came back to volleyball after a short break. In 2017 he moved to Jihostroj České Budějovice.

Honours

Universiade
 2019  Summer Universiade

References

External links
 
 Player profile at PlusLiga.pl 
 Player profile at Volleybox.net

1995 births
Living people
Sportspeople from Płock
Polish men's volleyball players
Universiade medalists in volleyball
Universiade silver medalists for Poland
Medalists at the 2019 Summer Universiade
Projekt Warsaw players
Trefl Gdańsk players
Warta Zawiercie players
Ślepsk Suwałki players